Makak is a town in central Cameroon, in Central province.

Transport 

It is served by a station on the national railway system.

See also 
 Communes of Cameroon
 Railway stations in Cameroon

References 

Populated places in Centre Region (Cameroon)